Cardiff Met WFC is a women's football club based in Cardiff, Wales. It is the student team of Cardiff Metropolitan University.

The club is one of the most successful Women's Welsh Premier League team after winning the title five times (2011–12, 2014–15, 2015–16, 2017–18 and 2018–19) and qualifying multiple times for the UEFA Women's Champions League.

The team was named UWIC Ladies until they changed their team name to Cardiff Met. Ladies AFC after the 2011–12 season. They then renamed from Ladies to Womens ahead of the 2018/19 season.

Squad

Top flight record
The club was a founding member of the Premier League in 2009, taking part in the four team Southern Conference.

The first two seasons saw the club finish in second place in the Southern Conference behind eventual champions Swansea City Ladies, having won all their matches, except the encounters with The Swans. The 2011/12 season proved to be their year as they avoided defeat against the reigning champions and qualified for the Championship Final, which they won 3–0 against Wrexham Ladies at Victoria Park, Llanidloes. Nadia Lawrence, Sophie Scherschel and Lauran Welsh scored the goals that sealed the club's first ever national title.

In the 2018-19 season, Cardiff Met Women won the domestic treble after winning the Premier League, the FAW Women's Cup and the Welsh Premier Women's Cup. Cardiff Met were also unbeaten in the domestic season, winning 14 and drawing 2 of their 16 league games.

Honours
Adran Premier:
 Champions (6): 2011–12, 2013–14, 2014–15, 2015–16, 2017–18, 2018-19
FAW Women's Cup:
 Champions (3): 2013–14, 2016–17, 2018-19
Runners-up: 2010, 2012, 2013
Adran Trophy:
 Champions (3): 2013–14, 2016–17, 2018-19
 British Universities & Colleges Sport (BUCS) champions 2012–13, 2013–14

Record in UEFA Women's Champions League

Summary

By season

History
Cardiff Met. Ladies made history by recording the new record win for a Women's Premier League match on 10 March 2013 when they defeated Caerphilly Castle Ladies 43–0, surpassing a previous record set by Newcastle Emlyn Ladies against the same opponents. Emily Allen holds the record of the most goals in a Women's Premier League match, with 15 in Cardiff Met. Ladies record win.

References

External links 
Official website

1992 establishments in Wales
Women's football clubs in Wales
Association football clubs established in 1992
Football clubs in Cardiff
Cardiff Metropolitan University
Welsh Premier Women's Football League clubs